Arthur Ashe and Stan Smith won the inaugural doubles tennis title at the Masters Grand Prix by defeating both teams they faced in the round-robin stage.

Round robin

Standings

Standings are determined by: 1. number of wins; 2. number of matches; 3. in two-players-ties, head-to-head records; 4. in three-players-ties, percentage of sets won, or of games won; 5. steering-committee decision.

References

Doubles